How Rude! is an American series of comical manners books for teens written by educator and psychologist Alex J. Packer, PhD.

Contents
In 465 pages, How Rude!: The Teenagers' Guide to Good Manners, Proper Behavior and Not Grossing People Out covers most aspects of life that teens are likely to encounter. The text is broken up into short chunks for easy reading.

According to Packer, "Good manners are good for you. They impress people. They build self-esteem. They can help you get what you want from life: friends, fun, success and respect. And they don't cost anything." Seeking to avoid the stereotype of etiquette books as preachy and dull, How Rude! keeps teenage readers amused as they learn the basics of polite behavior in all kinds of situations: at home, at school, in public, with friends, with strangers, at the mall, at the movies, on the phone, online, in conversations, at job interviews, in restaurants, on elevators, in cars, on skateboards, at parties, at formal dinners, on the bus and anywhere they go.

Young readers find out how to cope with cliques, handle friendship problems, be a host with the most (and a guest with the best), offer someone their seat, fight fair, answer invitations, deal with rude adults, respond to bigoted remarks, write a letter, dress properly for any occasion, master the proper techniques for civilized spitting, scratching, sneezing, yawning, coughing, hiccuping, nose-picking and much more.

Hundreds of "Dear Alex" questions and answers cover everything from dating to breaking up, thank-you notes to table manners, ethnic jokes to obscene phone calls, skiing to driving. "True Stories from the Manners Frontier" divulge the shocking consequences of not having good manners. Survey results reveal what teens, parents and teachers think about manners and why they are important.

Reception
How Rude! was selected by Young Adult Library Services Association (YALSA) as a "Popular Paperback for Young Adults" and a "Quick Pick for Reluctant Young Adult Readers."

Voice of Youth Advocates called How Rude! "the most incredibly readable, enjoyable, laughable, enlightening and insightful book." College Bound magazine described How Rude! as "...one fast-paced, fun-to-read book that covers the basics of good behavior for teens... Just one look at the table of contents will convince you that this isn't your grandma's guidebook. This is a wonderfully hip and humorous easy read!"

School Library Journal wrote, "From its intriguing title to the tongue-in-cheek ideas for dealing with many kinds of situations, readers will find this manual humorous, non-threatening, entertaining and educational."

Author
Packer is an author of many books on parenting. He is President Emeritus of FCD Educational Services, which provides drug education to colleges and schools.

Other books by Packer include: Wise Highs!: How to Thrill, Chill and Get Away from It All Without Alcohol or Other Drugs; Parenting One Day at a Time; Bringing Up Parents: The Teenager's Handbook; 365 Ways to Love Your Child; and with co-author John Dacey, Ph.D., The Nurturing Parent: How to Rasie Creative, Loving, Responsible Children. Packer's books have been translated into many languages including Spanish, German, Serbian, Mandarin, Romanian, Greek, Japanese, Korean and Thai.

References

Etiquette
Young adult non-fiction books